The European Federation of Pharmaceutical Industries and Associations (EFPIA) is a Brussels-based trade association and lobbying organisation, founded in 1978 and representing the research-based pharmaceutical industry operating in Europe. Through its membership of 37 national associations and 38 leading pharmaceutical companies, EFPIA represents 1,900 European companies in the areas of researching, developing and manufacturing new medical treatments.

Figures in 2021 by the European Commission showed that based on the companies included in its scoreboard Health industries spent 19.9% of all the business research & development in Europe, only surpassed by the Automobiles & Parts industry (33.6%). But the percentage of European spending on R&D in this sector was considerably lower than in the United States.

The key contribution of the research-based pharmaceutical industry to medical progress is to turn fundamental research into
innovative treatments that are widely available and accessible to patients, with the goal of helping people live longer and be healthier. High blood pressure and cardiovascular disease can be controlled with anti-hypertensive medicines and cholesterol-lowering medicines, knee or hip replacements prevent patients from immobility, and some cancers can be controlled or even cured thanks to newer targeted medicines. Yet there remain huge challenges in many disease areas such as Alzheimer, multiple sclerosis, many cancers and orphan diseases.

EFPIA also includes two specialised groups focusing on vaccines and biotechnology respectively:
 Vaccines Europe produce approximately 80% of vaccines used worldwide.
 European Biopharmaceutical Enterprises harness biotechnology to develop approximately one-fifth of new medicines.

EFPIA priorities
The industry's efforts are focused around four key areas - the AIMS - Roadmap of priorities Access, Innovation, Mobilization, Security program.
 Access refers to the need to continue to work towards speeding up regulatory approval and reimbursement processes for new medicines; removing government controls on medicines that are not reimbursed; and ensuring that Health Technology Assessment (HTA) does not become a fourth hurdle to market access.
 Innovation focuses on efforts towards creating a strong science base in Europe and making Europe an attractive location for the best researchers; ensuring a fair reward for innovation, including incremental innovation and ensuring a high level of protection for Intellectual Property Rights.
 Mobilization is about joining forces with key stakeholders to address the challenges of an ageing population and deliver modern and sustainable healthcare; to fight damaging cost-containment policies; to empower patients and citizens to take an active role in managing their health through better access to information from multiple sources; to highlight industry's contribution to access to medicines and to promote new incentives for research into diseases affecting the developing world.
 Security refers to the need to strengthen the integrity and transparency of the pharmaceutical supply chain by addressing the safety concerns of parallel trade; raising public awareness on the risk of counterfeits; and increasing the traceability of pharmaceutical products.

Research and Development (R&D)
In 2010 the pharmaceutical industry invested about €27,800 million in R&D in Europe. After a decade of strong US market dominance, which led to a significant shift of economic and pharmaceutical research activity towards the US during the period 1995–2005, Europe is now also facing increasing competition from emerging economies. Today there is rapid growth in the market and research environment in emerging economies such as Brazil, China and India, resulting in further migration of economic and research activities outside of Europe to these fast-growing markets. The geographical balance of the pharmaceutical market – and ultimately the R&D base – is likely to shift gradually towards emerging economies.

All new medicines introduced into the market are the result of lengthy, costly and risky research and development (R&D) conducted by pharmaceutical companies:
 By the time a medicinal product reaches the market, an average of 12–13 years will have elapsed since the first synthesis of the new active substance;
 The cost of researching and developing a new chemical or biological entity was estimated at €1,059 million ($1,318 million in year 2005 dollars) in 2005 (Di Masi J., Tufts University, Centre for the Study of Drug Development, 2007);
 On average, only one or two of every 10,000 substances synthesised in laboratories, will successfully pass all the stages to become marketable medicines.

There is rapid growth in the research environment in emerging economies such as China and India. The current tendency to close R&D sites in Europe and to open new sites in Asia will show dramatic effects to maintain the pharmaceutical discovery expertise in the EU. The United States still dominates the biopharmaceutical field, accounting for the three quarters of the world's biotechnology revenues and R&D spending.

In 2007 North America accounted for 45.9% of world pharmaceutical sales against 31.1% for Europe. According to IMS Health data, 66% of sales of new medicines launched during the period 2004-2008 were generated on the US market, compared with 26% on the European market.

Source: Eurostat
EFPIA

Innovative Medicines Initiative
The Innovative Medicines Initiative (IMI) is a public-private partnership designed by the European Commission and EFPIA. It is a pan-European collaboration that brings together large biopharmaceutical companies, small- and medium-sized enterprises (SMEs), patient organisations, academia, hospitals and public authorities. The initiative aims to accelerate the discovery and development of better medicines by removing bottlenecks in the drug development process. It focuses on creating better methods and tools that improve and enhance the drug development process, rather than on developing specific, new medicines.

The European Commission and EFPIA have jointly established a new-non-profit European Community body. This organisation has a legal mandate to award research grants to European public-private collaborations conducting innovative research projects that focus on implementing the recommendation of the IMI Research Agenda.

The IMI Research Agenda was established under the lead of industry following intensive consultations with a broad range of stakeholders from across Europe. It identifies the principal research bottlenecks in the biopharmaceutical R&D process and sets forth recommendations to overcome these bottlenecks by focusing on four areas:
 Predicting safety: this addresses bottlenecks related to accurately evaluating the safety of a compound during the pre-clinical phase of the development process, but also impacts the later phases in clinical development.
 Predicting efficacy: this addresses bottlenecks in the ability to predict how a drug will interact in humans and how it may produce a change in function.
 Knowledge management: this addresses the more effective use of information and data for predicting safety and efficacy.
 Education & training: this closes existing training gaps in the drug development process.

IMI will make Europe more attractive for biopharmaceutical R&D investments and boost the competitiveness of European life science R&D. By directly addressing the challenges facing the biopharmaceutical sector in Europe, IMI has the potential to:
 modernise the development of medicines
 expand European expertise and know-how in new technologies to attract biomedical R&D investment to Europe
 anchor R&D jobs in Europe and reverse the brain drain
 enhance Europe's economy by improving the conditions for the biomedical industry and intensifying the collaboration of all stakeholders.

Controversy 
From 1991 to 1998 Emer Cooke worked for the EFPIA. She became executive director of the European Medicines Agency (EMA), an agency of the European Union (EU) in charge of the evaluation and supervision of medicinal products, in November 2020.

In a session of the Austrian Parliament member of parliament Gerald Hauser on 1 April 2021 publicly criticised a potential conflict of interest, by her allowing the controversial Oxford–AstraZeneca COVID-19 vaccine to be approved, while having worked for the very same industry in the past as a lobbyist of the EFPIA.

See also 
 European and Developing Countries Clinical Trials Partnership (EDCTP)
 EuropaBio
 European Federation of Biotechnology (EFB)
 International Federation of Pharmaceutical Manufacturers Associations (IFPMA)
 Pharmaceutical Research and Manufacturers of America (PhRMA)
 Pharmaceutical company
 Portuguese Pharmaceutical Industry Association

References

External links 
  of the European Federation of Pharmaceutical Industries and Associations – (EFPIA)
Innovative Medicines Initiative (IMI)
 Vaccines Europe (VE)
 European Biopharmaceutical Enterprises (EBE)
 

European medical and health organizations
Pharmaceutical industry trade groups
Pan-European trade and professional organizations
Life sciences industry
Lobbying organizations in Europe
International organisations based in Belgium
Organizations established in 1978
1978 establishments in Europe
Pharmaceutical industry